Ghostbusters: Afterlife is a 2021 American supernatural comedy film directed by Jason Reitman from a screenplay he co-wrote with Gil Kenan. It is the sequel to Ghostbusters (1984) and Ghostbusters II (1989), and the fourth film in the Ghostbusters franchise. The film stars Carrie Coon, Finn Wolfhard, Mckenna Grace, and Paul Rudd, alongside Bill Murray, Dan Aykroyd, Ernie Hudson, Annie Potts, and Sigourney Weaver reprising their characters from the earlier films. Set 32 years after the events of Ghostbusters II, it follows a single mother and her children who move to an Oklahoma farm they inherited from her estranged father Egon Spengler, a member of the original Ghostbusters.

A third Ghostbusters film was in development since the release of Ghostbusters II, but production stalled because Murray refused to return to the series. After cast member Harold Ramis died on February 24, 2014, Sony produced a female-driven reboot which was released in 2016. In 2019, Jason Reitman confirmed a sequel to the original films, the new cast was announced by July, and the original cast signed on two months later. Filming took place from July to October. This was the final film to be produced by and involve the franchise's co-creator Ivan Reitman before his death in February 2022.

Produced by Columbia Pictures in association with Bron Creative, Ghostbusters: Afterlife was screened unannounced during the CinemaCon event in Las Vegas on August 23, 2021, and was then released in the United States on November 19, after being delayed four times from an original July 2020 date due to the COVID-19 pandemic. The film received praise for the cast's performances, Reitman's direction, nostalgic tone, and its respectful tribute to Ramis, with criticism mostly being directed towards its screenplay and fan service. It grossed $204 million worldwide against a production budget of $75 million. A sequel is set to be released on December 20, 2023.

Plot

In Summerville, Oklahoma, Egon Spengler captures an entity in occultist Ivo Shandor's mine outside the town and lures another creature to his farm. Egon activates an elaborate setup on his property, but the power fails, and he conceals the ghost trap in his home before being attacked by the creature and suffering a fatal heart attack. His estranged, financially struggling daughter, Callie, inherits the farm and moves there with her children, Trevor and Phoebe, after being evicted from their Chicago apartment. Trevor becomes infatuated with carhop Lucky Domingo, and the scientifically minded Phoebe enrolls in a summer science class taught by seismologist Gary Grooberson.

Phoebe discovers the farmhouse is haunted, and the poltergeist residing in it leads her to the ghost trap, which she shows to Gary and her new friend, Podcast. Gary, a fan of the Ghostbusters, helps Phoebe learn more about them and her grandfather. He, Phoebe, and Podcast tamper with the trap, releasing one of Gozer the Gozerian's Sentinels, which escapes to the mine. The farm ghost leads Phoebe to Egon's underground laboratory and after revealing himself as her grandfather, guides her in restoring the Ghostbusters' equipment. While testing the proton pack with Podcast, she finds a ghost they call "Muncher" that haunts Shandor's foundry and flees to the town. Having repaired the Ghostbusters' Cadillac Ecto-1's engine (with Egon's help), Trevor uses the car to chase Muncher with the pair; they capture it, but are arrested for the damage incurred, and their equipment is seized.

Using the Ghostbusters' telephone number that she had written down, Phoebe contacts Ray Stantz for help and tells him Egon has died. Ray in turn informs Phoebe of what became of the Ghostbusters after they defeated Vigo the Carpathian: After the Ghostbusters had disbanded, Egon stole their equipment and moved to Summerville to pursue an unspecified threat. Egon's ghost leads Callie to a wall of detailed notes and pictures he kept of his daughter's life, showing he cared about her more than she thought.

Phoebe, Podcast, Lucky, and Trevor find a Gozerian temple within the mine. Exploring further, they discover Shandor is alive in his casket, and automated proton cannons, installed by Egon, hinder Gozer's attempts to cross over. Zuul and Vinz Clortho possess Callie and Gary, respectively, and destroy Egon's equipment, allowing Gozer to escape. Shandor awakens and pledges his fealty to Gozer, but is killed nevertheless.

The children discover Egon's setup is an array of ghost traps buried around the dirt field. With supernatural chaos distracting the town, the neophyte Ghostbusters recover the seized equipment and travel to the mine. Phoebe distracts Gozer so Podcast can capture Zuul, freeing Callie and weakening Gozer's physical form. They lure Gozer to the trap field, but it malfunctions and Gozer frees Zuul, who possesses Lucky and fully restores Gozer's power. Ray and the other surviving original Ghostbusters, Peter Venkman and Winston Zeddemore, arrive to help, and Gozer, after having already killed Egon, seeks to complete its revenge against the quartet for vanquishing it. Supported by Egon's now-visible ghost, Phoebe battles Gozer with her grandfather's proton pack. The Ghostbusters help Phoebe restrain Gozer by crossing their proton streams while Trevor uses his to charge the traps' power source, allowing Callie to activate the ghost traps and capture Gozer and its minions. Lucky and Gary are freed from their possessions, and Egon reconciles with his family and friends before departing for the hereafter.

Later,  Peter is revealed to be married to Dana Barrett. Winston, having become a wealthy entrepreneur and family man since leaving the Ghostbusters, returns Ecto-1 to the Ghostbusters' firehouse. In the basement, a light on the ecto-containment unit flashes red.

Cast

The new film's cast was announced by July 2019, with the cast of the original film signing on two months later: 

 Mckenna Grace as Phoebe Spengler
 Finn Wolfhard as Trevor Spengler
 Logan Kim as Podcast
 Celeste O'Connor as Lucky Domingo
 Carrie Coon as Callie Spengler
 Paul Rudd as Gary Grooberson
 Bill Murray as Peter Venkman
 Dan Aykroyd as Raymond "Ray" Stantz
 Ernie Hudson as Winston Zeddemore
 Annie Potts as Janine Melnitz
 Sigourney Weaver as Dana Barrett

The film's cast also includes Bokeem Woodbine as sheriff Sherman Domingo, Lucky's father; Marlon Kazadi as Thickneck; Sydney Mae Diaz as Swayze; and Aykroyd's youngest daughter Stella as Deputy Medjuck, a nod to Joe Medjuck, who was an associate producer on Ghostbusters (1984), an executive producer on the subsequent movies, and a co-founder of production company Ghost Corps. Harold Ramis posthumously appears as Egon Spengler in archival clips and photographs taken from Ghostbusters (1984). Bob Gunton (credited as "The Ghost Farmer") and Ivan Reitman also portray living and ghostly versions of Egon, respectively, using prosthetics and digital makeup. J. K. Simmons plays Ivo Shandor, the leader of a Gozer-worshiping cult responsible for the Sumerian god Gozer's arrival in Ghostbusters. Simmons took the role as a token of friendship with the Reitmans, with whom he frequently collaborates in films like Jason's 2007 film Juno and the 2017 film Father Figures, co-produced by Ivan. Olivia Wilde, who portrayed Mesopotamian deity Inanna in Ramis's final film Year One, physically portrays Gozer, Shohreh Aghdashloo provides Gozer's voice, and Emma Portner plays Gozer's CGI spirit form. Josh Gad was one of many actors who contributed to the voice of Muncher, a metal-eating miner ghost conjured after a séance went wrong at Summerville Foundry in the 1940s.  Ira Heiden, a friend of Jason Reitman's, along with Sarah Natochenny and Shelby Young, were three of the voice actors who voiced the Mini-Pufts, tiny versions of the Stay Puft Marshmallow Man.

Production

Development as Ghostbusters III
In the early 1990s, following the release of Ghostbusters II, Dan Aykroyd wrote a script for a third film tentatively titled Ghostbusters III: Hellbent. In the script, the Ghostbusters are transported to a parallel-universe version of Manhattan called Manhellton, where the people and places are "hellish" versions of Earth, and the characters meet and confront the Devil. At the time, Aykroyd stated that Columbia Pictures was interested, though the principal actors, especially Bill Murray, were not. The Hellbent script's main characters are a new, younger group of Ghostbusters; Ray, Egon, and Winston struggle to keep the business going after Peter's relationship with Dana becomes serious. Elements of this story were used in Ghostbusters: The Video Game (2009), which Aykroyd considered to be "essentially the third movie". At various stages of its development, Chris Farley, Chris Rock, and Ben Stiller were reported as potential stars of a new Ghostbusters film.

By 2004, Columbia had begun pursuing a sequel but Murray, who disliked sequels, was uninterested in the project. The following year, Harold Ramis confirmed plans to introduce Stiller into the principal cast. By 2009, the project had failed to progress, but by January 2010, Ivan Reitman, director of the first two Ghostbusters films, confirmed he would direct a third one. Also in March, Murray discussed development of the film and his mixed feelings about reprising his role. A release was scheduled for Christmas 2012. That October, Aykroyd commented on the screenplay written by Gene Stupnitsky and Lee Eisenberg, stating that he was particularly impressed with the writing of Murray's character and the implementation of the new team with the original while he and Ramis worked on a second draft of the script.

By August 2011, Aykroyd stated that filming was scheduled to begin later that year with a story focused on passing the Ghostbusters mantle to the younger actors. When Murray decided against reprising his role, Aykroyd said another actor might replace him. Aykroyd also said he wanted retired actor Rick Moranis to return as Louis Tully. By February 2012, the film was placed on hold as the production team re-evaluated the project. Without Murray, the studio searched for replacement actors and considered including his character as a CGI-rendered ghost. In June, Murray again acknowledged all involved were attempting to develop the third film before dropping out of the film the following month. In July, Aykroyd confirmed the film was back in development with a script re-write from Etan Cohen. Aykroyd said of the script: "It's got to be perfect. That's the whole thing. There's no point in doing it unless it's perfect. So that's what we're up to now." By September, Reitman announced the developments of a remake. In May 2013, Aykroyd discussed plot points including real experiments being done by college students at Columbia University as a source of inspiration. The plot would revolve around research being done by the university, which would bring about threats from other dimensions. A new team of Ghostbusters would form to save Earth's plane of existence from supernatural threats. The script reportedly included Murray's character with hopes Murray would decide to join the production.

Following the death of Harold Ramis on February 24, 2014, Sony/Columbia stated that Ramis would appear in a cameo in the film. The film was delayed again to rework the script. By March 2015, Reitman was no longer attached to direct the third film, but would remain as producer, with plans to begin principal photography by early 2015. Weaver wanted her character's son to feature as a member of the team, and Reitman said he had already been included in the script.

Development as Ghostbusters: Afterlife
A new film connected to the original two films was revealed in January 2019. Ivan Reitman's son Jason was confirmed to direct from a script he co-wrote with Gil Kenan while Ivan would serve as a producer. The film would feature teenagers—two males and two females—as the new recruits for the Ghostbusters team.

Jason Reitman said the film ignores the events of 2016's Ghostbusters reboot, which was directed by Paul Feig. Reitman said he did not mean to snub the 2016 film and that he had "nothing but admiration" for Feig. Feig said Reitman had been a supporter of his film and that he "can't wait to see his take on the Ghostbusters universe". Reitman later said the idea of a teenage girl wanting to be a Ghostbuster had come to him, and with a positive reaction from Feig's film, proved the idea that anyone could be a Ghostbuster would work. Reitman also said the Ghostbusters franchise could readily expand on this idea with all types of people becoming Ghostbusters, personally thanking Feig for making this possible. Reitman considered, unlike the three prior Ghostbusters films—all of which involve people going into the ghostbusting business—he wanted to make this film about family first. With Kenan, Reitman created a script based around the Spengler family and the reason they are so disconnected. According to Dan Aykroyd: "Jason Reitman wrote a beautiful, heartfelt script that takes the real DNA from the first two movies and transfers that directly to the third, the next generation. It hands the legacy off to a new generation of stars, and players, and actors, and characters." Murray, who was also confirmed to be reprising Peter Venkman, was positive about the script. Ramis's daughter Violet (whom Reitman befriended during the filming of the first film), gave her blessing after reading an early version of the screenplay, saying that the story "captures the spirit of what the old movies are". She occasionally visited the sets, and was (at the insistence of Reitman and propmaster Guillaume DeLouche) photographed wearing her late father's proton pack prop from the first film while prop makers from The Hand Prop Room in Los Angeles were building lighter replicas of it for Mckenna Grace to wear.

With a script centered around family, Reitman felt it was appropriate to change the backdrop from New York City to the American West to give the film a new identity and a different color palette. The setting of the film, Summerville, Oklahoma, was first mentioned in Ghostbusters: The Video Game (2009). The script was structured to slowly reveal the connection to the Egon Spengler character, which would bring in elements of earlier Ghostbusters films. For example, the film sees Aykroyd's character returned to running Ray's Occult Books, as seen in Ghostbusters II, but only the events of the original film are directly referenced.

Casting
The castings of Mckenna Grace as the young female protagonist, Finn Wolfhard as her brother, and Carrie Coon as their single mother were revealed in March 2019. Reitman described Grace as an avid fan of the series and a perfect fit for his concept of a teenage-female Ghostbuster. Wolfhard, who had dressed as a Ghostbuster during the second season of Stranger Things, was unsure he would get the role, saying that "Jason Reitman is probably not even going to look at my tape" because of that. Paul Rudd was cast in the film in June, later confirming his role of Mr. Grooberson, the children's new teacher who knows of the Ghostbusters' legacy. Rudd himself had worked with Harold Ramis in an uncredited role for his final film Year One.

Newcomers Celeste O'Connor and Logan Kim were cast in July. Bill Murray, Dan Aykroyd, Ernie Hudson, Sigourney Weaver, and Annie Potts were confirmed to be reprising their roles from the first two Ghostbusters films. Rick Moranis, who also appeared in the first two Ghostbusters films, did not return to reprise his role in the film.

Design
Reitman shot on location and relied on practical effects as much as possible to maintain stylistic continuity with the original films. The Spengler farmhouse was a practical set built on a ridge that recalled the Psycho house. An old barn was relocated and reconstructed piece-by-piece on location for the unveiling of Ecto-1. Two Ectomobiles were used during filming. While the vehicles were vintage 1959 Cadillac Miller-Meteor Sentinels, modern performance engines and suspension upgrades were required to complete the stunt sequences which were filmed on real city streets.

Creature Effects
Reitman and the production crew reviewed the designs of the original film's ghosts and other supernatural creatures for use in Afterlife, observing the designs looked different from each other and were distinct. The creature known as "Muncher", co-created by creature designer Brynn Metheney, is similar to Slimer; Reitman explained: "Something happened to Slimer over the years that people started thinking of him as the dalmatian of the firehouse. The original Slimer was an angry dude and very scary and we wanted to get back to that", and Metheney wanted to make Muncher whom "the audience can latch on to" easily, giving him a universal appeal of him being "funny and cool and cute and weird in every way" like Slimer yet completely new and different from his green predecessor. Though the film did not reveal Muncher's origin, Metheney's character personality reveals that the ghost in life was a miner "conjured into existence by a séance gone wrong in the 1940s" at Summerville Foundry's supervisor's office and he has haunted the plant ever since then, "after terrorizing the group that contacted him". Her most ambitious design was the Mini-Pufts; she wanted to give them a realistic look on scale and texture of authentic marshmallows than the colossal Stay Puft Marshmallow Man, even bought packages of them to make tiny marshmallow men for visual references and inspirations. For the scenes of Summerville Crossrip, Metheney created the "flaming phantasms" that chase a firetruck and pedestrians outside the Spinners Roller Hop and included the animated series The Real Ghostbusters''' popular three-eye ghost Bug-Eye in homage to the show. Other apparition concepts that did not make the final cut include a rancher ghost, Louise the crossing guard ghost of Summerville Middle School, possessed balloons and sandwiches, and more miner ghosts (Dynamite, Pick Axe, Lunchbox, Coats, and Shovel) after Muncher. Creature effects designer Arjen Tuiten, who is a fan of the first film's special effects artist Steve Johnson, personally created the "Old Miner Ghost" in resemblance to his idol's "Zombie Taxi Ghost" without Metheney's involvement.

Egon's Aztec Death Whistle was designed by Landon Lott under Jason Reitman's instruction, and despite the claim in the film that whistles like it are "designed to ward off evil spirits", their actual purpose remains unclear.

Ramis's likeness was recreated with digital makeup created by Pier Lefebvre and his team at Moving Picture Company (MPC) Film in Los Angeles, based on his appearance in the original films and number of photographs and footages of him being aged taken prior to his death. Bob Gunton and Ivan Reitman (his right hand holding the barrel of a proton pack's neutrona wand) physically performed the role. Special effects technicians and puppeteers, including Ronald Binion (suit puppeteer for Slimer in the 2016 Ghostbusters film), portrayed Egon's poltergeist by puppeteering objects and lights in his house and storm-cellar laboratory.

Filming
Under the working title "Rust City", principal photography began on July 12, 2019, in and around Calgary, Alberta, and lasted until October. Location filming occurred in surrounding communities such as Crossfield, Beiseker, Drumheller and Fort Macleod (Muncher chase scene) during July and August. Other locations around Alberta were also used. Filming was wrapped after 68 days on October 18.

Music

The score for Ghostbusters: Afterlife was composed by Rob Simonsen, and conducted by William Ross and Anthony Parnther. Simonsen studied Elmer Bernstein's score for the first Ghostbusters film and recruited Bernstein's son Peter, who guided the orchestration of Simonsen's score and the use of material from Ghostbusters (1984), as a score consultant. Simonsen used the ondes martenot throughout the score, which was played by Cynthia Millar, who played the same instrument on Bernstein's 1984 Ghostbusters score. The soundtrack was released on  Compact Disc on November 19, 2021.

The songs "Ghostbusters", which was performed by Ray Parker Jr., and "Haunted House", which was written and performed by Mckenna Grace are heard during the film's end credits. The songs "The Clapping Song" by Shirley Ellis, "Baby It's You" by The Shirelles, "Can You Get to That" by Funkadelic, "Boredom" by Buzzcocks, "All Your Love (I Miss Loving)" by Otis Rush, "Muddy Water" by The Delmore Brothers, "Wait a Minute Girl" by The Newday, "Foolish Try" by Kelly's Lot, and "On the Road Again" by Willie Nelson are used in the film.

Release
TheatricalGhostbusters: Afterlife was scheduled to be released in the United States on July 10, 2020, by Sony Pictures Releasing but its release was postponed to March 5, 2021, due to the COVID-19 pandemic. Sony pushed the film to June 11, 2021, then later shifted the release to November 11, 2021. The film's release was again postponed to November 19. The film was dedicated to Ramis and executive producer Tom Pollock (who died shortly before its completion), and the former is commemorated before its closing credits. 

The film was given a surprise screening on August 23 during the 2021 CinemaCon event in Las Vegas; and another for fans at the 2021 New York Comic Con.

Marketing
In August 2019, toy manufacturer and multimedia company Hasbro obtained the master toy license for the Ghostbusters franchise, with the new products (including action figures and role-play items) originally scheduled to be released in stores in April 2020. Because of the pandemic delays to the film's release date, the introduction of Ghostbusters: Afterlife toys to market was also delayed. Target received exclusive versions of some toys ahead of the projected June 2021 release date, but further rollouts were held back when the studio announced an additional delay until November. A new line of Hasbro action figures based on the film was unveiled on the same day the second trailer debuted. It included several characters and costumes that had not been seen in any promotional material for the film before. In November, Zaxby's promoted the film with a commercial featuring Ghostbusters: Afterlife Mini-Pufts.

Home media
Following the film's theatrical screenings, it was released digitally on January 4, 2022 and on DVD, Blu-ray, and Ultra HD Blu-ray on February 1 in North America.

After its digital release on PVOD services, the film acquired the top position on iTunes and Vudu, while being placed second on Google Play. Overall, it spent four weeks at the top position on iTunes and Vudu, while spending five weeks at the top rank on Google Play. The film debuted at the second position on Redbox's digital chart. It was the top-selling digital title on "Redbox On Demand" for four consecutive weeks.

After debuting on disc, it acquired the top position on the "NPD VideoScan First Alert" chart which tracks combined DVD and Blu-ray sales. It sold 285,642 units overall for $5.3 million. It maintained its position in the overall sales for the following week, while being displaced from the top position in the Blu-ray sales by Encanto. It was also the most-rented film from Redbox kiosks for three consecutive weeks.
 The film was the highest-selling title for the month of February according to the "NPD VideoScan First Alert" chart.

Reception
Box officeGhostbusters: Afterlife grossed $129.4million in the United States and Canada, and $75million in other territories, grossing $204.4 million worldwide and becoming the tenth-highest-grossing American film of 2021. Scott Mendelson of Forbes described the film's theatrical run as "relatively successful" and said it was "made cheaply enough to be a hit".

In the United States and Canada, Ghostbusters: Afterlife was released alongside King Richard, and earned $16.6 million on its first day—including $4.5 million from Thursday night previews, $1 million more than the 2016 film. The film debuted to revenues of $44 million, topping the box office. It made $5.3 million on Thanksgiving and $24.2 million in its second weekend, finishing second behind newcomer Encanto.

In its third weekend, the film earned $10.35 million and exceeded $100 million in the U.S. and Canada. In its fourth weekend, the film dropped to third place at the box office and earned $7.1 million. It made $3.4 million in its fifth weekend, placing fourth, and $1.2 million in its sixth, finishing eleventh. The film returned to the box-office top ten in its seventh weekend, earning $1.5 million and finishing seventh. In its eighth weekend, the film made $1.1 million and finished eighth. The film returned to the box office top ten in its eleventh weekend, earning $776,451 and finishing eighth.

Paul Dergarabedian of Comscore said Ghostbusters: Afterlife opened to a "really solid number" that showed the "brand is really powerful even some 37 years after the original became a cultural phenomenon". The Associated Press noted the "crucial difference" between this film and the 2016 reboot is that Ghostbusters: Afterlife "cost about half as much to make". Variety described the film's opening weekend box office as "stronger-than-expected" and "an important victory for the studio after it failed in 2016 to revive the decades-old series".

Critical response
The site's critical consensus reads, "Ghostbusters: Afterlife crosses the streams between franchise revival and exercise in nostalgia -- and this time around, the bustin' mostly feels good". Metacritic, which uses a weighted average, assigned the film a score of 45 out of 100 based on 47 critics, indicating "mixed or average reviews". Audiences polled by CinemaScore gave the film an average grade of "A−" on an A+ to F scale, while those at PostTrak gave it an 82% positive score, and 69% said they would definitely recommend it.

Sheri Linden of The Hollywood Reporter described the film's cast as "engaging" and "[having] the comic beats down", and added that "they also play more fully fleshed people than the first film offered, reflecting the director's interest in character-driven stories". She also noted some similarities between the film and Stranger Things, The Wizard of Oz, and Close Encounters of the Third Kind. Olly Richards of Empire gave the film a score of four out of five, describing it as "thoroughly lovely" and saying it "firmly establishes its own new generation" while being "full of love for the originals". Peter Debruge of Variety described the film as an "unnecessary but enjoyable movie", and added: "The good news for Ghostbusters fans is that Afterlife does nothing to tarnish what has come before".

William Bibbiani of TheWrap commented that Ghostbusters: Afterlife will probably satisfy fans of Ghostbusters (1984)—particularly those who like finding Easter eggs—but might disappoint viewers who want it to offer something different; but these could still enjoy the film's "slick and straightforward, formulaic craftsmanship". Scott Mendelson of Forbes gave the film a score of 6 out of 10, describing it as a "charming and witty kid-centric coming-of-age fantasy", but criticized its reliance on "pandering" nostalgic fanservice. Kyle Smith of National Review described the film as "a winsome, endearing summer movie for November, a cunningly engineered generational bridge". The Guardian critic Charles Bramesco gave it one out of five, finding it lacks the humor of Ghostbusters (1984) and instead resembles an "Amblin knockoff" that is similar to the television series Stranger Things. Bramensco concluded it is "a nostalgia object, drained of personality and fitted into a dully palatable mold, custom-made for a fandom that worships everything and respects nothing".

Accolades 

Sequel
Aykroyd has expressed interest in having the surviving cast of the original Ghostbusters team reprise their roles in up to three sequels. On the possibility of sequels, David A. Gross of Franchise Entertainment Research said the box-office results were "excellent" and would "encourage Sony to forge ahead with new installments". In April 2022, a sequel was confirmed to be in early development and it would take place in New York City. A separate animated film from Sony Pictures Animation was also announced to be in development, to be directed by Chris Prynoski and Jennifer Kluska, and written by Brenda Hsueh. The film is scheduled to be released on December 20, 2023. Mckenna Grace is confirmed to reprise her role. 

In December, Gil Kenan took over as director from Reitman, who still remains as a writer and producer. Paul Rudd, Finn Wolfhard, and Carrie Coon were also confirmed to return alongside Grace. On March 20, 2023 a photo of Reitman and Kenan was posted to the Ghostbusters Facebook page showing them on the set of the new movie, initially titled Firehouse''.

Notes

References

External links

 
 

2020s English-language films
2020s comedy mystery films
2020s fantasy comedy films
2020s American films
2020s ghost films
2020s monster movies
2021 comedy films
2021 fantasy films
2021 films
American chase films
American comedy mystery films
American coming-of-age comedy films
American fantasy comedy films
American teen films
American haunted house films
Middle school films
American sequel films
Bron Studios films
Columbia Pictures films
Films about earthquakes
Films about inheritances
Films about old age
Films about poverty
Films about precognition
Films about single parent families
Films about spirit possession
Films directed by Jason Reitman
Puppet films
Films postponed due to the COVID-19 pandemic
Films scored by Rob Simonsen
Films set in 2021
Films set on farms
Films set in mining communities
Films set in Chicago
Films set in New York City
Films set in Oklahoma
Films shot in Calgary
Films using motion capture
Ghostbusters films
IMAX films
The Montecito Picture Company films
Teen mystery films
Films produced by Ivan Reitman
American films about revenge